Mladen Delić (15 January 1919, Sinj – 22 February 2005) was a Croatian sports commentator.

He studied law at the University of Belgrade, but switched to the School of physical education and sport in Belgrade where he graduated in 1938. From 1946 to 1948 he continued to work as a teacher in Zagreb. During World War II he served in the pro-Axis Croatian Home Guard.

He entered into journalism after the war, writing for Narodni sport and Borba, as well as working for Radio Zagreb. He had his first radio program in 1947. In 1950 he formed an editorial board for sports within Radio Zagreb. He worked as a reporter and commentator from 1965 to his retirement in 1984.

Delić's brother, Svemir, was a footballer who made one appearance for the Croatia national team.

His "Ljudi moji, je li to moguće?" (My people, is that possible?) comment as Ljubomir Radanović scored a stoppage time goal against Bulgaria that qualified Yugoslavia for the UEFA Euro 1984 remains one of the most famous comments and is quoted to this day across former Yugoslavia.

He received a lifetime achievement award from the Croatian Sports Journalists Association in 1994. He is buried in Mirogoj Cemetery.

References

1919 births
2005 deaths
People from Sinj
Croatian journalists
Croatian television journalists
Croatian radio journalists
Croatian radio presenters
Sports commentators
Croatian Home Guard personnel
University of Belgrade Faculty of Sport and Physical Education alumni
20th-century journalists
Burials at Mirogoj Cemetery